Primary phase can refer to:

Materials science, see Liquidus temperature
 The Hitchhiker's Guide to the Galaxy Primary and Secondary Phases, a radio series